Kashgari is a Uyghur family name, meaning "the one from city of Kashgar". Kashgar is a historic city in Xinjiang Uyghur Autonomous region in China. The name may refer to:

 Hamza Kashgari (born 1989), Saudi columnist with Uyghur background
 Mahmud al-Kashgari, eleventh century Uyghur Turkic scholar from Kashgar

Uyghur-language surnames